Clanculus maxillatus is a species of sea snail, a marine gastropod mollusk in the family Trochidae, the top snails.

References

External links
 To Biodiversity Heritage Library (2 publications)
 To World Register of Marine Species

maxillatus
Gastropods described in 1843